Ogmocoma is a moth genus, belonging to the family Tineidae. It contains only one species, Ogmocoma pharmacista, which is found on Rodrigues Island in Mauritius.

References

Tineidae
Monotypic moth genera
Moths of Mauritius
Fauna of Rodrigues
Tineidae genera
Taxa named by Edward Meyrick